Norrøn livskunst is the seventh studio album by Norwegian avant-garde black metal band Solefald and their first album released through Indie Recordings.

Track listing

Concept
The press release for described the album as such:
With "Norrøn livskunst", SOLEFALD looks to the early 1900-century Norway, when a young nation zealously engaged in exploring its cultural roots. Writers, painters and composers rediscovered Norse mythology, the Edda and the sagas. Houses and buildings were designed in the Norse "dragon style" and decorated with medieval motifs. Sports clubs were named after Norse deities, and Snorri Sturluson's "Heimskringla" had a natural place in every home. Explorers went out to conquer the most inhospitable regions of the world. Some of that same madness is underlying in black metal: When others hunt for fame and fast money, leave it to the Norwegians to colonise frozen continents and old cemeteries. As Cornelius Jakhelln's saga novel "The Fall Of The Gods" states: "They called it evil. They called it True Norwegian Black Metal.

Musical style
The album marked some minor changes in vocal styles from both members. Cornelius employed the aggressive style he developed on the albums prior to An Icelandic Odyssey and with his side project Sturmgeist. He also introduced a deep, nearly spoken word vocal approach not before heard with Solefald. Lazare's vocal arrangements are some of the most dense and sophisticated he's ever performed. The musical style covers a broad range, as is expected by now from Solefald. Aggressive extreme metal, heavily electronic passages and complex multilayered vocals. The album also features guest contributions in the forms of vocals, saxophone and guitar. The majority of the original lyrics with the exception of "Waves Over Valhalla" and a portion of "Stridsljod/Blackabilly" which are in English, are written in a 1917 variant of Norwegian called høgnorsk (high Norwegian), which is a conservative written language preceding today's much more common nynorsk (Neo-Norwegian).

Band members
 Lazare - Vocals, synth, electronic beats, drums and percussion
 Cornelius - Vocals, guitars and bass

Guests
 Agnete Kjølsrud (ex-Animal Alpha, Djerv) - vocals (on tracks 3 & 7)
 Benedicte Maurseth - vocals (on tracks 1, 8 & 10) and Hardanger fiddle (on track 1)
 Kjetil Selvik - Saxophone (on tracks 4, 5 & 7)
 Vangelis Labrakis - lead guitar (on track 6)
 King is credited for "wah howls" on track 4 courtesy of Chilihead/Egghead Prodz. King is a character that performs in the band Chilihead in Cornelius Jakhelln's novel Voguesville. The song "Stridsljod / Blackabilly" is dedicated to King.

Technical staff
 Mixed by Endre Kirkesola at Dub Studio
 Mastered by Vangelis Labrakis and Stamos Koliousis at 210 Studios, Berlin
 Cornelius' vocals, guitars and bass recorded by Christer-André Cedergren at Oslo Lydstudio
 Lazare's vocals recorded at Dub Studio
 Drums recorded and produced by Asgeir Mickelson at Toproom Studio
 Drums engineered by Børge Finstad
 Keys and effects recorded at Mezzanine Studio
 Trine + Kim design studio - cover layout & design
 Band photographs by Sidsel Jakhelln Semb

Release history

Funding
 Cultiva Ekspress funded the mixing of the album.
 Fond For Lyd Og Bilde funded the poetic journey to Høgnorsk.

References

Solefald albums
2010 albums
Indie Recordings albums